Nisobamate (INN; W-1015) is a tranquilizer of the carbamate family which was never marketed.

See also 
 Meprobamate

References 

Carbamates
Sedatives
GABAA receptor positive allosteric modulators
Abandoned drugs